Maahir is a 1996 Indian Hindi-language action drama film written by Talat Rakhi and directed by Lawrence D'Souza for Monang Films International. The film stars Govinda and Farah Naaz in lead roles.

Cast

 Hema Malini as Mrs. Kamini Rai
 Govinda as Bhola / Police Inspector Shankar
 Farha Naaz as Paro
 Raj Babbar as Jabbar Khan alias J.K.
Manjeet Kullar
 Anupam Kher as Balwant Rai
 Ranjeet as Bob
 Alok Nath as Amar Rai
 Tej Sapru as Vicky Rai
 Dinesh Hingoo as Constable
 Aruna Irani as Nurse
 Mac Mohan as Murarilal
 Reema Lagoo as Asha
 Kader Khan as Jailor
 Master Bhagwan as Dancer in bar    
 Vikas Anand as Corrupt Inspector
 Gopal Shetty

Music
Soundtrack:
"Deewanapan Hai Yeh" - Mohammed Aziz, Kavita Krishnamurthy
"O Ganga Maiya" - Bappi Lahiri
"Raja Raja Ab To Main Hoon" - Sudesh Bhosale, Nitin Mukesh
"Roz Roz Rozi Ki Daru Piyo" - Sudesh Bhosale, Usha Mangeshkar
"Tukda Main Tere Dil Ka Maa" - Kumar Sanu
"Tukda Main Tere Dil Ka Maa" (sad) - Alka Yagnik
"Vaada Karke Jaate Ho Tum" - Kumar Sanu, Alka Yagnik

References

External links

1996 films
Films scored by Bappi Lahiri
1990s Hindi-language films
Films directed by Lawrence D'Souza
Indian action drama films